The XVII International Chopin Piano Competition was held in Warsaw on April 13–24, 2015 (preliminary round) and October 1–23, 2015 (main competition and concerts). Prize winners' concerts were on October 21–23, 2015.

Seong-Jin Cho of South Korea won the competition.

Awards 

Seong-Jin Cho won the competition, playing the Piano Concerto in E minor, Opus 11 in the final. The prize money was €30,000. In addition, he also won the €3,000 prize for best polonaise, playing the Polonaise in A flat major, Opus 53 in the second stage.

Charles Richard-Hamelin of Canada came second, Kate Liu of the United States came third, Eric Lu of the United States came fourth, Tony Yike Yang of Canada came fifth, and Dmitry Shishkin of Russia was placed sixth.
The following prizes were awarded:

In addition, four special prizes were awarded independently:

Jury 
The juries consisted of:

Preliminary round jury

  
  Akiko Ebi (5th X)
  Adam Harasiewicz ( V)
  Yves Henry
  Andrzej Jasiński
  Ivan Klánský
  Anna Malikova
  Alberto Nosè
  Piotr Paleczny (3rd VIII)
   (5th X)
  Katarzyna Popowa-Zydroń (chairwoman); (HM IX)
  Marta Sosińska-Janczewska
  
  Dina Joffe ( IX)

Competition jury
  Dmitri Alexeev
  Martha Argerich ( VII)
  Akiko Ebi (5th X)
   Đặng Thái Sơn ( X)
  Philippe Entremont
  
  Adam Harasiewicz ( V)
  Andrzej Jasiński
  Li Yundi ( XIV)
  Garrick Ohlsson( VIII)
  Janusz Olejniczak (6th VIII)
  Piotr Paleczny (3rd VIII)
   (5th X)
  Katarzyna Popowa-Zydroń (chairwoman); (HM IX)
  
  
  Dina Joffe ( IX)

Philippe Entremont caused controversy when he gave Seong-Jin Cho, the winner of the competition, a score of just 1 in the final, the lowest possible score. This was a substantial deviation from the other jurors; 14 of the 17 jurors gave Cho 9 or more points, leading to speculation that Entremont had trouble with Cho's teacher Michel Béroff. A popular conjecture that Entremont may have been racially motivated could not be proven by statistical analysis.

Competitor results
Yes: percentage of jurors who voted to pass the participant to the next round (excluding recusals)

Pts: average number of points (excluding recusals)

References

Further reading

External links 
 
 Jury scores: Stage I, Stage II, Stage III, Final
 Cyfrowe Radio Chopin. 24 godziny na dobę!
 Contestants in wikidata

International Chopin Piano Competition
2015 in music
2015 in Poland
2015 in Polish music
2010s in Warsaw
October 2015 events in Europe